The Siltʼe people are an ethnic group in southern Ethiopia. They inhabit the Siltʼe Zone which is part of the Southern Nations, Nationalities and Peoples Region. Silt'e people speak Siltʼe language a Semitic language which is closely related to Wolane, Zay and Harari languages. Siltʼe denote their origin to the city of Harar and claim to be progenitors of the Hadiya Sultanate. One of the Silt'e people's ancestor was Hajji Aliye who accompanied Ahmed ibn Ibrahim al-Ghazi's troops during the Ethiopian-Adal war in the sixteenth century. The last Garad of the Gan-Silte dynasty was Sediso K’albo before Menelik's forces invaded in the 1800s. Silte people were incorporated into Gurage region after their lands were annexed by Ethiopia, in the early 90s Silte obtained a separate zone following protests that the Gurage ethnic label was imposed on them.

Notable people
Muferiat Kamil
Redwan Hussein
Siraj Fegessa
Muktar Edris

References

Bibliography
Abdulfetah Huldar 2000 (A.D.): Islam be-Ityopya inna ye-Silte hizb tarikinna bahil. Addis Ababa (in Amharic).
Abdulfetah Huldar 2002 (A.D.): YeSiltʼennat beherawi magalachʼawochchinna la-Ityopyawinet hilwinanna idiget yabarekketut asitewas'o. Addis Ababa (in Amharic).
Abraham Hussen and Habtamu Wandimmo 1983 (E.C.): Ba-Siltʼiñña qwanqwa tanagari hizb ye-Azernet Berbere hibratasab bahilinna tarik. Addis Ababa (in Amharic).
Ulrich Braukämper 1980: Die Geschichte der Hadiyya Süd-Äthiopiens. Wiesbaden. Franz-Steiner Verlag.
Dirk Bustorf 2005: "Ennäqor ethnography". In: Siegbert Uhlig (ed.): Encyclopaedia Aethiopica. vol. 2: D-Ha. Wiesbaden. p. 309-10
Dirk Bustorf 2006: "Ase Zäʼra Yaʼǝqobs Kinder. Spuren der Vorbevölkerung von Selte-Land". Aethiopica 9. pp. 23–48.
Dirk Bustorf 2010: "Sǝlṭi ethnography". In: Siegbert Uhlig (ed.): Encyclopaedia Aethiopica. vol. 4: O-X. Wiesbaden: Harrassowitz. pp. 607–608.
Dirk Bustorf 2010: "Wǝlbaräg". In: Siegbert Uhlig (ed.): Encyclopaedia Aethiopica. vol. 4: O-X. Wiesbaden: Harrassowitz. pp. 1178–1179.
Dirk Bustorf 2011: Lebendige Überlieferung: Geschichte und Erinnerung der muslimischen Siltʼe Äthiopiens. With an English Summary. Wiesbaden: Harrassowitz (Aethiopistische Forschungen 74).
Nishi Makoto 2005: Making and Unmaking of the National-State and Ethnicity in Modern Ethiopia: a Study on the History of the Silte People. African Study Monographs. Supplementary Issue 29. pp. 157–68 online version
Dinberu Alamu et al. 1987 (E.C.): Gogot. Yegurage biherasab tarik, bahilinna qwanqwa, Walqite (in Amharic).
Rahmeto Hussein 1984: "The History of Azernet-Berbere until the Expansion of Shoa During Menelik II", Senior Essay, Department of History, Addis Ababa University .

Ethnic groups in Ethiopia
Muslim communities in Africa
Habesha peoples